Bruce Daniel Hartford (May 14, 1892 – May 25, 1975) was a Major League Baseball shortstop who played for one season. He played in eight games for the Cleveland Naps during the 1914 season.

External links

1892 births
1975 deaths
Cleveland Naps players
Major League Baseball shortstops
Baseball players from Illinois
Terre Haute Miners players
Bloomington Bloomers players
Terre Haute Terre-iers players
Des Moines Boosters players
Kansas City Blues (baseball) players
Seattle Rainiers players
Shreveport Gassers players
Birmingham Barons players
Chattanooga Lookouts players
Wilkes-Barre Barons (baseball) players
New Haven Profs players
York White Roses players
Elmira Colonels players